In linguistics, comparative illusions (CIs) or Escher sentences are certain comparative sentences which initially seem to be acceptable but upon closer reflection have no well-formed, sensical meaning. The typical example sentence used to typify this phenomenon is More people have been to Russia than I have. The effect has also been observed in other languages. Some studies have suggested that, at least in English, the effect is stronger for sentences whose predicate is repeatable. The effect has also been found to be stronger in some cases when there is a plural subject in the second clause.

Overview of ungrammaticality
Escher sentences are ungrammatical because a matrix clause subject like more people is making a comparison between two sets of individuals, but there is no such set of individuals in the second clause. For the sentence to be grammatical, the subject of the second clause must be a bare plural. Linguists have marked that it is "striking" that, despite the grammar of these sentences not possibly having a meaningful interpretation, people so often report that they sound acceptable, and that it is "remarkable" that people seldom notice any error.

History

Mario Montalbetti's 1984 Massachusetts Institute of Technology dissertation has been credited as being the first to note these sorts of sentences; in his prologue he gives acknowledgements to Hermann Schultze "for uttering the most amazing */? sentence I've ever heard: More people have been to Berlin than I have", although the dissertation itself does not discuss such sentences. Parallel examples with Russia instead of Berlin were briefly discussed in psycholinguistic work in the 1990s and 2000s by Thomas Bever and colleagues.

Geoffrey K. Pullum wrote about this phenomenon in a 2004 post on Language Log after Jim McCloskey brought it to his attention. In a post the following day, Mark Liberman gave the name "Escher sentences" to such sentences in reference to M. C. Escher's 1960 lithograph Ascending and Descending. He wrote:

Although rare, actual attestations of this construction have appeared in natural speech. Language Log has noted examples such as:

Another attested example is the following tweet from Dan Rather:

Research
Experiments on the acceptability of comparative illusion sentences has found results which are "highly variable both within and across studies". While the illusion of acceptability for comparative illusions has also been informally reported for speakers of Faroese, German, Icelandic, Polish, and Swedish, systematic investigation has mostly centered on English, although Aarhus University neurolinguist Ken Ramshøj Christensen has run several experiments on comparative illusions in Danish.

Perceived meanings
When Danish  and Swedish  speakers were asked what (1) means, their responses fell into one of the following categories:

Paraphrase (d) is in fact the only possible interpretation of (1); this is possible due to the lexical ambiguity of  "have" between an auxiliary verb and a lexical verb just as the English have; however the majority of participants (da: 78.9%; sv: 56%) gave a paraphrase which does not follow from the grammar. Another study where Danish participants had to pick from a set of paraphrases, say it meant something else, or say it was meaningless found that people selected "It does not make sense" for comparative illusions 63% of the time and selected it meant something 37% of the time.

Ellipsis
The first study examining what affects acceptability of these sentences was presented at the 2004 CUNY Conference on Human Sentencing Processing. Scott Fults and Collin Phillips found that Escher sentences with ellipsis (a) were found to be more acceptable than the same sentences without ellipsis (b).

Responses to this study noted that it only compared elided material to nothing, and that even in grammatical comparatives, ellipsis of repeated phrases is preferred. In order to control for the awkwardness of identical predicates, Alexis Wellwood and colleagues compared comparative illusions with ellipsis to those with a different predicate.
They found that both CI-type and control sentences were found to be slightly more acceptable with ellipsis, which led them to reject the hypothesis that ellipsis was responsible for the acceptability of CIs. Rather, it is possible people just prefer shorter sentences in general. Patrick Kelley's Michigan State University dissertation found similar results.

Repeatability
Alexis Wellwood and colleagues have found in experiments that the illusion of grammaticality is greater when the sentence's predicate is repeatable. For instance, (a) is experimentally found to be more acceptable than (b).

The comparative must be in the subject position for the illusion to work; sentences like (a) which also have verb phrase ellipsis are viewed as unacceptable without any illusion of acceptability:

A pilot study by Iria de Dios-Flores also found that repeatability of the predicate had an effect on the acceptability of CIs in English. However, Christensen's study on comparative illusions in Danish did not find a significant difference in acceptability for sentences with repeatable predicates (a) and those without (b).

Quantifier choice
The lexical ambiguity of the English quantifier more has led to a hypothesis where the acceptability of CIs is due to people reinterpreting a "comparative" more as an "additive" more. As fewer does not have such an ambiguity, Wellwood and colleagues tested to see if there was any difference in acceptability judgements depending on whether the sentences used fewer or more. In general, their study found significantly higher acceptability for sentences with more than with fewer but the difference did not disproportionately affect the comparative illusion sentences compared to the controls.

Subject choice
Experiments have also investigated the effects different kinds of subjects in the than-clause have on CIs' acceptability. Wellwood and colleagues found that sentences with first person singular pronoun I to be more acceptable than those with the third person singular pronoun he, though they note this might be due to discourse effects and the lack of a prior antecedent for he. They found no significant difference for sentences with a singular third person pronoun (he) and those with a singular definite description (the boy). There was no difference in number for the first person pronominal subject (I vs. we), but plural definite descriptions (the boys) were significantly more acceptable than singular definite descriptions (the boy). Christensen found that plural subjects ("women") in the than-clause led to significantly higher acceptability ratings than singular subjects ( "the hairdresser").

De Dios-Flores examined if there was an effect depending on whether or not the than-clause subject could be a subset of the matrix subject as in (a) compared to those where it could not be due to a gender mismatch as in (b). No significant differences were found.

Other grammatical factors
In a study of Danish speakers, CIs with prepositional sentential adverbials like  "in the evening" were found to be less acceptable than those without.

Comparatives in Bulgarian can optionally have the degree operator ; sentences with this morpheme (a) are immediately found unacceptable but those without it (b) produce the same illusion of acceptability.

Neurolinguistics
A neuroimaging study of Danish speakers found less activation in the left inferior frontal gyrus, left premotor cortex (BA 4, 6), and left posterior temporal cortex (BA 21, 22) when processing CIs like (a) than when processing grammatical clausal comparatives like (b). Christensen has suggested this shows CIs are easy to process but as they are nonsensical, processing is "shallow". Low LIFG activation levels also suggest that people do not perceive CIs as being semantically anomalous.

Explanations
Townsend and Bever have posited that Escher sentences get perceived as acceptable because they are an apparent blend of two grammatical templates.
Wellwood and colleagues have noted in response that the possibility of each clause being grammatical in a different sentence (a, b) does not guarantee a blend (c) would be acceptable.
Wellwood and colleagues also interpret Townsend and Bever's theory as requiring a shared lexical element in each template. If this version is right, they predict (c) would be viewed as less acceptable due to the ungrammaticality of (b):
Wellwood and colleagues, based on their experimental results, have rejected Townsend and Bever's hypothesis and instead support their event comparison hypothesis, which states that comparative illusions are due to speakers reinterpreting these sentences as discussing a comparison of events.

Similar constructions
The term "comparative illusion" has sometimes been used as an umbrella term which also encompasses "depth charge" sentences like "No head injury is too trivial to be ignored." This example, first discussed by Peter Cathcart Wason and Shuli Reich in 1979, is very often initially perceived as having the meaning "No head injury should be ignored—even if it's trivial", even though upon careful consideration the sentence actually says "All head injuries should be ignored—even trivial ones." The authors illustrate their point by comparing the sentence to "No missile is too small to be banned." 

Phillips and colleagues have discussed other grammatical illusions with respect to attraction, case in German, binding, and negative polarity items; speakers initially find such sentences acceptable, but later realize they are ungrammatical. It has also been compared to the "missing VP illusion".

See also
 Garden-path sentences, which are grammatical but are often initially parsed in a way which leads to unacceptability
 Center embedding, which can produce sentences which are grammatical but are often viewed as unacceptable due to difficulty in parsing
 Irish bull
 Colorless green ideas sleep furiously

Notes

References

Works cited

Further reading

 

Syntax
Parsing
Psycholinguistics
Linguistic error